Robert Williams (1863 – 13 October 1938) was Professor of History at St David's College, Lampeter.

He was born in Penycefn, Tregaron, Ceredigion. He was a history teacher in Saint David's College, Lampeter. He was also vicar of Llandeilo Fawr and Archdeacon of Carmarthen.

Works
 Y Mabinogion''' (Everyman's library). Gol. gan R. Williams. Dent, h.d.
 The Attack on the Church in Wales. "Evidence and Facts Collected and Sifted", 1912

Contributions to the DNB
This author wrote articles for the Dictionary of National Biography (signing as  "R. W."), and the list on this page is complete to 1901.

 Howel ab Owain Gwynedd
 Howel y Fwyall
 William Hughes (d. 1600)
 Griffith Jones (1683–1761)

Works about Williams
 Ben Davies, Robert Williams DYSG (1955) t. 206-9.
 Ayron Jenkins, Yr Hybarch Robert Williams (1939) t. 8-12.
 D. S. Jones, Er cof am yr Hyrbarch Robert Williams (1939) t. 13-14.
 Williams, Robert, in Alumni Oxonienses: the Members of the University of Oxford, 1715-1886 by Foster, Joseph, Oxford: Parker and Co., 1888-1892.
 Obituary Archdeacon Robert Williams'' in The Times

References

1863 births
1938 deaths
Archdeacons of Carmarthen
19th-century Anglican theologians
20th-century Anglican theologians